Dibar Dighi is a tank in Bangladesh. An octagonal granite pillar, associated with Kaivarta chief Dibya, who usurped the Pala throne, stands in the centre of the tank.

Location 
The site is located in Dibar village, on the northern side of Nazipur-Sapahar highway in Patnitala Upazila of Naogaon District.

Architecture

Dibar Dighi 
Alexander Cunningham, whose "servant" visited the site in 1879–80, noted the lake to spread about 1200 square ft. Average depth was about 12 ft. The tank currently occupies about 20 acres of land and sits atop a mound, spread over 100 acres.

Kaivarta Stambha 
The tank is primarily famed for housing a semi-submerged granite pillar — locally known as Kaivarta Stambha — in its center. The apex of the pillar is crown shaped and decorated with three inflated circular rings. The pillar does not have any inscriptions. Francis Buchanon-Hamilton's survey of Bengal (1807–08) measured the net height to be 22.5 cubits (33 ft, 75 in) and the diameter to be 6.5 cubits (9 ft, 9 in). He had deemed it to be octagonal in shape.

Cunningham's expedition revised the height to be approximately 30 ft — the visible portion spanned 10 ft, the submerged portion 12 ft, and the rest, underground foundation. From the logged data, he determined the pillar to be nonagonal having side-length of 12 in. each; diameter came out to be 29 in. Cunningham regretted that he did not personally visit the site, noting that such a large single-shaft stone pillar was yet to be recorded in Indian subcontinent, after Ashoka's reign.

A Bangladeshi archaeologist confirmed Cunningham's approximation but changed the distribution; 12 ft was above water level, 8 ft was submerged, and 10 ft was below ground.

History 
The site is yet to be accurately dated. The name of the village as 'Dibar' may be derived after the name of king Dibyak or Dibya. Local legends construct a mythological origin, wherein the lake was dug within one night by a jinn.

From an etymological perspective and literary history, it is currently argued that the tank and the pillar were commissioned to commemorate the victory of a local Kaivarta vassal, Dibyak (var. Dibya) over his 11th century overlord, Mahipala II. The cause of the war between Dibyak and Mahipala II can not be ascertained — R. C. Majumdar interpreted it to be a rebellion by a local samanta, strategically timed to the weakening of Pala authority whilst Ram Sharan Sharma took it to be a peasant rebellion against feudal suppression. The construction might have been executed in the reign of Dibyak himself or his successors — brother Rudak, and nephew Bhim.

Preservation 
In 1939, the Central Government declared Dibar Dighi to be a heritage site. Rajshahi Social Forestry Division has created an artificial forest (alongside a mini-zoo) around the tank; boating trips seem to be allowed.

See also
 Nazipur
 Varendra rebellion
 Ramacharitam

Notes

References

Rebellions in India
Medieval India
History of Bengal
Pala Empire
Naogaon District